Deafness in Poland is a topic relevant to education and communities. Poland has a history with DHH (Deaf or Hard of hearing) people, dating back to 1817. About 15.1% of Polish people in Poland say they have hearing loss. PJM (Polish Sign Language) is the main signed language in Poland.

Language emergence 
A Polish Sign Language school was founded in 1817 by a man named Jakub Falkowski, which allowed the language to develop . Polish Sign Language is called "" (PJM). Polish Sign Language was influenced by the Old French Sign Language and German Sign Language, this uses a one-handed alphabet. Piotr Gąsowski was the first deaf boy to learn Polish Sign Language, his teacher was Jakub Falkowski. Piotr Gąsowski was not using sign language before Jakub met him. Jakub was educated in Old French Sign Language and German Sign Language, thus influenced Polish Sign Language, by adding the Polish alphabet. PJM has the characteristics of a deaf community sign language.

Deaf-led organizations

Polish Association of the Deaf (Łódź Division) 
The Polish Association of the Deaf was founded in 1946. Its main goal is to bring the deaf and hard of hearing community together and give them the support they need. The Polish Association of the Deaf (Łódź Division) is privately run but receives monetary support from the government. The board consists of 9 members, and 7 of whom are deaf. In May 2016, the began a project, that aimed to provide professional activation for 160 deaf Polish people (graduates of school for the Deaf in Poland). The members continue today to push for greater equality between the deaf and hearing communities in Poland.

Polish Deaf Sports Association 
The Polish Deaf Sports Association was founded in 1924 and exists under the Danish Sports Association. It provides access to sports at any level—from grassroots to internationally competitive, and even the Olympics—to those who are deaf and hard of hearing.

SALTO-YOUTH 
SALTO-YOUTH is an organization that has many different projects, and one involving helping the deaf community in Poland. One main project was in partnership with Polish Association of the Deaf. In 2019, a group of people went to local or rural areas with people in the DHH community, they were struggling with work on their houses and or farms. SALTO went to houses and schools in the communities and gave them basic supplies such as school supplies like writing utensils, food, and water. They also help clean up some of the areas around the schools. SALTO-Youth advocates for civil and human rights. The organization promotes the right to human education for the DHH community. They want to see every kid have an equal opportunity when it comes to education. SALTO-YOUTH provides opportunities to capture attention from authorities to give the DHH people a voice. Overall, they create a safe space for the participants to try out human rights education methods and tools with their community.

Human/civil rights and the CRPD 
Deaf people's human rights are inextricably linked to sign language, as emphasized by the Convention on the Rights of Persons with Disabilities, which Poland signed in September 2015. The Committee on the Rights of Persons with Disabilities requires that the countries involved submit periodic reports, to which Poland has complied. The World Federation of the Deaf, an NGO, classifies Poland as a country with Sign Language Recognition, as well as National Language Council Recognition.

Poland's Initial Country Report (submitted to the UN) 
The articles chosen below were chosen based on the World Federation of the Deaf's priority areas.
 Article 9: The government claims that people who are deaf in Poland receive the same services as a normal person would in all postal stations. Post offices in Poland have a special station for people who are deaf. This station has locals who can communicate with a deaf person.
 Article 21: They claim that people who are a part of the DHH community have the same rights to an attorney. A courthouse in Kraków, Poland, has lawyers who can sign and communicate with a judge. There are special court sessions for those in the DHH community. Forms of communication are different when it comes to the people a part of the DHH community in Poland. Talking to people in public can be difficult, in article 21 of the CRPD they can have a person assist them in communication with others. In A court of law, people have the right to an attorney under any circumstance.
 Article 24: Education is an important thing, especially for children who are deaf or mute. Every child in Poland is given the right to education no matter what. In accordance with article 24, children in DHH's community can receive assistance both in and out of the classroom. 
There have been reports of a high rate of sexual violence against both men and women in the DHH community in Poland. (as of 2018)

In 2013, many opportunities like jobs and or important events were not accessible to the deaf people of Poland.

Deaf Learning Project 
The Deaf Learning Project has offered rights for the DHH community by offering education to adults who are a part of the DHH community. This project has helped many DHH adults to have the opportunity to education.

4 Step Program 
The 4 Step Program has offered basic human and civil rights to the DHH community by giving people the aid they need to apply for a job. This program has helped many people in the DHH community get jobs and gain basic skills.

Language deprivation 
It is widely acknowledged that language deprivation among deaf children prevents many individuals and children from acquiring the necessary skills to succeed in society and in the classroom As a result of insufficient exposure to language input during early childhood. Many children are not exposed to it at home and school. Hearing loss can affect a person's social skills and ability to communicate which can lead to language deprivation. For a population scale there is no data about DHH children's language in Poland are unavailable.

Primary and secondary education 
The first school for the deaf and hard of hearing was found in 1817. Deaf children were first given access to kindergartens in 1919, after which basic vocational schools were established for the deaf in 1934. Today there are 39 deaf schools in Poland. Around the world, deaf children rarely have access to preschool and are often included in typical classrooms with assistants. Poland's Ministry of National Education initiated and funded a project to develop Polish school textbooks adapted to the needs of deaf students. In the past 30 years, Poland has experienced significant social and educational changes, influencing both students with special needs and ideas about their place in society.

Instytut Gtuchoniemych 
In Poland, there are three schools specifically for DHH students who aim to develop PJM skills. Instytut Gtuchoniemych im. Jakuba Falkowskiego is a school located is Warszwa Poland. Since 1936, this school has offered boarding (housing) to students so those who do not live nearby can stay at the school during the week. At the Institute education is provided from pre-school to post primary level. They mainly focus on reading and writing skills in PJM, as well as basic communication. Their mission is to serve as the educational and cultural center for the Deaf. Parents of deaf children can take courses at the institute to learn Sign Language.

Zwiazek Zydowskich Gluchoniemych 
Zwiazek Zydowskich Gluchoniemych was located in Karków Poland and was founded in 1935. A little over 400 deaf and hard of hearing Jews were members of the school in Poland during the interwar years. At the Institute primary education was provided as well as extra circulars such as clubs and sports. The school closed in 1939, due to the Second World War outbreak.

Higher education 
DHH students must take an admission and proficiency test to go to a university. The educational laws governing DHH students were not accepted at the university level in 2001, which made it difficult for DHH students to gain a higher education.

Deaf Learning- PAD (Łódź Division) 
Not all students are accepted to a university, so there is a program called the Deaf Learning Project, in partnership with The Polish Association of the Deaf (Łódź Division). As a whole they prepare national language programs for teaching deaf adults. The literacy rates in deaf adults in Poland are low in reading and writing. People who graduate a secondary education have the ability to learn Polish though a 400-hour course.

Employment 
Deaf and hard-of-hearing people in Poland struggle to find employment. IFHOHYP did an international survey, not specific to Poland, on employment and when having a bigger job than working at a store people find it harder to communicate in meetings, boss impatient with accommodations. Throughout Poland and the rest of Europe, disabled workers face exploitation, discrimination, and mobbing. According to the international survey done by IFHOHYP, the disabled are able to work for minimum wage because just having a job is a great happiness for them. The employment rate for disabled people in Poland is low (as of 2010) and continues to decrease overtime. In Europe (including Poland) and internationally the disabled community has less access to job, tend to get turned away from jobs.

4 Step Program 
The 4 Step Program is a program that helps support deaf people on the labor market. This project was started when the UCN of Rights of persons with disabilities was approved in 2006. This program helps increase knowledge and the labor market for people with disabilities, including DHH. In Poland the 4 Step Program specifically helps deaf people on the labor market II, they help people prepare to look for jobs. When a person with disabilities is turned away from higher education, the 4 Step program takes their spot. They help education people with basic skills and communication. They also help them prepare a resume to find jobs, as well as help them find and enroll in a job. Certain activities that they do improve professional skills, gaining experience on the labor. The project activities include workshops, individual action plans, rehabilitation internships, legal and psychological support, training, and other activities, all of which contribute to accomplishing these goals.

Healthcare 
The Charter of Rights of Disabled Persons was approved by Polish Parliament in 1997. Interpreters of sign language work in a variety of translation environments, in a variety of conditions, in a variety of situations, and on a variety of bases. Interpreters are available in Poland's hospitals for medical doctor appointments with family physicians, specialists, both in clinics and hospitals. The specific needs and services are education rehabilitation. A deaf person in Poland can have access to emergency services with an interpreter. Poland and the E.U. have free public healthcare system and with people for disabilities. Children with disabilities, young people with severe disabilities, and the elderly are eligible for medical care allowances. Pediatric cochlear implants have become easier in Poland since the 1990s by having modifications of the healthcare system. There are no laws in place to provide interpreters for deaf patients in Poland.

Language endangerment and revitalization

EGIDS Scale 
Polish Sign Language (PJM) is listed on the Expanded Graded Intergenerational Disruption Scale.

 PJM is legally recognized by the Polish government.
 PJM is at risk, due to the lack of education and exposure early on, as shown in the Language Depravation section.

The Survival of PJM 
The influence of Old French Language and German Sign language has kept Polish Sign Language (PJM) Many deaf schools interpreters use Old French Language and German Sign language, to help teach Polish Sign Language. The disappearance of PMJ, cochlear implants and deaf people raises concern for the DHH community. Poland has made many technological advances, it has been providing hearing aids to large companies.

References 

Poland
Disability in Poland